The Rolling Stones, Now! is the third American studio album by English rock band the Rolling Stones, released on 13 February 1965 by their initial American distributor, London Records. Although it contains two previously unissued songs and an alternative version, the album mostly consists of songs released earlier in the United Kingdom, plus the group's recent single in the United States, "Heart of Stone" backed with "What a Shame". Mick Jagger and Keith Richards wrote four of the songs on the album (including the US single), with the balance composed by American rhythm and blues and rock and roll artists.

Marketing and sales 
The album reached number five on the Billboard 200 album chart and was certified "gold" by the Recording Industry Association of America.  The liner notes on initial pressings contained producer Andrew Loog Oldham's advice to the record buying public, which was quickly temporarily removed from some subsequent pressings:
 This quote also appeared on some issues of the UK Rolling Stones No. 2 LP.

In August 2002, The Rolling Stones, Now! was reissued in a new remastered CD and SACD digipak by ABKCO Records. This version included stereo mixes of "Heart of Stone", "What a Shame", and "Down the Road Apiece".

Critical reception

In a retrospective review, music critic Richie Unterberger gave the album AllMusic's highest rating (5 out of 5 stars).  He commented "Now! is almost uniformly strong start-to-finish, the emphasis on some of their blackest material. The covers of "Down Home Girl," Bo Diddley's vibrating "Mona," Otis Redding's "Pain in My Heart," and Barbara Lynn's "Oh Baby" are all among the group's best R&B interpretations."

The Rolling Stone magazine album guide also gave the album 5 out of 5 stars, the highest rating for a pre-Aftermath album by the group.  It noted "The Rolling Stones, Now! is their first consistently great LP, with the mean 'Heart of Stone,' the funky 'Off the Hook,' and the Leiber-Stoller oldie 'Down Home Girl.  The magazine also ranked it at number 180 on the list of the 500 Greatest Albums of All Time.

Now! was one of the first four rock albums purchased by future music critic Robert Christgau. For Paul Gambaccini's 1978 book Critic's Choice: Top 200 Albums, he included it in his top-10 albums submission at number nine. He also listed it in his "Basic Record Library" of 1950s and 1960s recordings, published in Christgau's Record Guide: Rock Albums of the Seventies (1981). In commentaries on the album, he has called it "classic", "passionate and urgent", and "easily the sharpest of the pre-Aftermath Stones LPs".

Track listing

Recording sessions
The songs were recorded between 10 June and 8 November 1964 at the Chess Records studio in Chicago, and RCA Records studio in Hollywood, California; except "Mona (I Need You Baby)", 3–4 January 1964, Regent Sound Studios, London.

Personnel
The Rolling Stones
Mick Jagger – lead vocals, harmonica, tambourine, percussion
Keith Richards – electric guitar, backing vocals
Brian Jones – electric and slide guitars, harmonica, backing vocals
Charlie Watts – drums, percussion
Bill Wyman – bass guitar, backing vocals

Additional personnel
Jack Nitzsche – piano (2, 4), "Nitzsche phone" (sound effects on 9)
Ian Stewart – piano (1, 5, 7)

Charts

Certifications

References

External links
Rolling Stones Are Satisfied with SACD

1965 albums
ABKCO Records albums
Albums produced by Andrew Loog Oldham
London Records albums
The Rolling Stones albums